Patrick Connor may refer to:
Patrick Edward Connor (1820–1891), Union general during the American Civil War
Patrick Connor (Irish politician) (1906–1989), Irish Fine Gael Party Senator and TD for Kerry South
Patrick Connor (actor) (1926–2008), British actor

See also
Patrick O'Connor (disambiguation)